Nelson Beasley Vails  (born October 13, 1960) is a retired road and track cyclist from the United States. He rode as a professional from 1988 to 1995 representing the US at the 1984 Summer Olympics in Los Angeles, California, where he became the first African American and first person of African descent to medal in cycling. He won the silver medal in the sprint, behind countryman Mark Gorski. He was inducted to the US Bicycle Hall of Fame in 2009.

Vails was also seen as a New York bicycle messenger in the film Quicksilver.  He didn't just play a bicycle messenger in "Quicksilver," he worked as one in New York City. His nickname was "The Cheetah." After his sporting career he has worked as a cycling commentator for major TV networks and taken part in cycling safety programs.

In 2005 Vails was inducted into the Lehigh Valley Velodrome Cycling Hall of Fame.

Palmarès 

1983
 1st Pan American Games, individual sprint
1984
 2nd Olympic Games, sprint
 1st  US National Track Champion, individual sprint
 1st  US National Track Champion, tandem sprint
1985
 2nd  Track World Champion, tandem sprint
 1st  US National Track Champion, tandem sprint
1986
 1st  US National Track Champion, tandem sprint

References 

1960 births
Living people
Sportspeople from Manhattan
People from Harlem
American male cyclists
African-American people
Olympic silver medalists for the United States in cycling
Cyclists at the 1984 Summer Olympics
Medalists at the 1984 Summer Olympics
Cyclists at the 1983 Pan American Games
Pan American Games gold medalists for the United States
Pan American Games medalists in cycling
Medalists at the 1983 Pan American Games